Donald Isidro Merza Dulay (born October 17, 1980 in Los Angeles, California) is a Filipino-American former professional basketball player. He is the current coach of the Makati OKBet Kings of the Maharlika Pilipinas Basketball League (MPBL). He was an undrafted player but was later signed by Rain or Shine in 2007. He is also given the moniker "Double D" because of the D's in his first name and surname.

Player profile
Dulay applied for the 2006 PBA draft but no team drafted him. He was signed by the Welcoat Dragons as a free agent in the 2007–08 PBA season. Dulay, known in local Philippine basketball as ‘Double D’, plays Guard and stands 5’8″. Born and raised in Los Angeles, California, he moved to the Philippines to pursue his basketball career. Dulay starred for Cebuana Lhuillier and Welcoat Dragons in the Philippine Basketball League (PBL) before bringing his struts to the Philippine Basketball Association (PBA), where he played for the Rain or Shine Elasto Painters and the Alaska Aces.

References

External links
Player Profile
Asia-Basket Profile

1980 births
Living people
Alaska Aces (PBA) players
American sportspeople of Filipino descent
Basketball players from Los Angeles
Filipino expatriate basketball people in Singapore
Filipino men's basketball players
Point guards
Rain or Shine Elasto Painters players
Singapore Slingers players
Rain or Shine Elasto Painters coaches
Filipino men's basketball coaches
American men's basketball players
Citizens of the Philippines through descent